Montargil Airfield  is a recreational aerodrome serving Montargil and Mora, Portugal. It is sometimes called Morargil, which is a portmanteau of the names of the nearest localities, Mora and Montargil.

Runway length includes approximately  displaced thresholds at each end.

See also
Transport in Portugal
List of airports in Portugal

References

External links
OurAirports - Montargil
SkyVector Aeronautical Charts
OpenStreetMap - Mora Municipal Airport

Airports in Portugal